Mark Turner is the name of:

Mark Turner (musician) (born 1965), jazz saxophonist
Mark Turner (cognitive scientist) (born 1954), cognitive scientist, linguist, and author
Mark Turner (cricketer, born 1984), English cricketer
Mark Turner (cricketer, born 1969), former English cricketer
Mark Turner (Australian footballer) (born 1960), Australian rules footballer
Mark Turner (footballer, born 1972), English footballer
Mark Turner (judge) (born 1959), British judge of the High Court of England and Wales
Mark Turner (politician), British-Australian politician and police officer